Ndrumbea, variously spelled Ndumbea, Dubea, Drubea and Païta, is a New Caledonian language that gave its name to the capital of New Caledonia, Nouméa, and the neighboring town of Dumbéa. It has been displaced to villages outside the capital, with fewer than a thousand speakers remaining. Gordon (1995) estimates that there may only be two or three hundred. The Dubea are the people; the language has been called Naa Dubea (or more precisely Ṇã́ã Ṇḍùmbea) "language of Dubea".

Ndrumbea is one of the few Austronesian languages that is tonal, and it has a series of consonants that are also unusual for the region.

Phonology
Ndrumbea, like its close relative Numee, is a tonal language, with three contrasting tones, high, mid, and low.

Vowels
Ndrumbea has seven oral vowels, long and short. The mid front vowels are lower when short than long: . There are five nasal vowels, also long and short: . These interact with nasal consonants, described below. In addition to the complementary correlation of nasal vowels with nasal consonants, nasal vowels do not occur after . –oral vowel derives historically from –nasal vowel.

Phonetically, a stop–flap consonant cluster will be separated by an obscure epenthetic vowel with the quality of the following phonemic vowel.

Consonants
Nasal vowels once contrasted after nasal stops, as they still do in Numee. However, in Ndrumbea, nasal stops partially denasalized before oral vowels, so that now prenasalized stops precede oral vowels, and nasal stops precede nasal vowels. Similarly,  only occurs before oral vowels.

The fricatives  are sometimes realized as approximants . However, the approximants  are never fricated. The nasal stop  sometimes has incomplete closure, producing a nasalized approximant . It does not occur word initially, and does not contrast with  word medially.

It is not clear if  is apico-dental or denti-alveolar, but it has a sharp release burst. , on the other hand, has a noisy release and approaches an affricate, .

References
 Ndrumbea language alphabet and pronunciation at Omniglot

Shintani T. L. A. & Païta Y. (1990a) Grammaire de la langue de Païta. Nouméa: Sociéte d'Etudes Historiques de Nouvelle-Calédonie.
Shintani T. L. A. & Païta Y. (1990b) Dictionnaire de la langue de Païta. Nouméa: Sociéte d'Etudes Historiques de Nouvelle-Calédonie.

New Caledonian languages
Languages of New Caledonia
Tonal languages in non-tonal families
Vulnerable languages